Rosemont station is a SEPTA Regional Rail station in Rosemont, Pennsylvania. It is located at Airdale Road and Montrose Avenues and is served by most Paoli/Thorndale Line trains.

The station was originally built by the Pennsylvania Railroad between 1863 and 1871 (appears on 1871 atlas). As a modern SEPTA station, the building is also occupied by a real estate broker's office and underwent renovations for this use in 1983. The ticket office at this station is open weekdays 6:00 AM to 10:55 AM excluding holidays. There are 112 parking spaces at the station. This station is 10.9 track miles from Philadelphia's Suburban Station. In 2017, the average total weekday boardings at this station was 323, and the average total weekday alightings was 321.

Station layout
Rosemont has two low-level side platforms with pathways connecting the platforms to the inner tracks.

References

External links

 SEPTA - Rosemont Station
 Airdale Road entrance from Google Maps Street View
  Lower Merion Township Historic Resource Inventory

SEPTA Regional Rail stations
Former Pennsylvania Railroad stations
Philadelphia to Harrisburg Main Line
Lower Merion Township, Pennsylvania
Railway stations in Montgomery County, Pennsylvania
Railway stations in the United States opened in 1880
1880 establishments in Pennsylvania